The von Minutoli family originally came from Lucca or Naples and hiked over into Switzerland during the 17th century.  They included:  

Heinrich Menu von Minutoli
Julius Rudolph Ottomar Freiherr von Minutoli
Wolfardine von Minutoli

Swiss families
Families of Italian ancestry